Medvedki is a rural locality (a village) in Krasavinskoye Rural Settlement, Velikoustyugsky District, Vologda Oblast, Russia. The population was 5 as of 2002.

Geography 
Medvedki is located 28 km northeast of Veliky Ustyug (the district's administrative centre) by road. Skornyakovo is the nearest rural locality.

References 

Rural localities in Velikoustyugsky District